The Horatio G. Foss House is an historic house at 19 Elm Street in Auburn, Maine within the Main Street Historic District.  It was built in 1914 to a design by Gibbs & Pulsifer for Horatio G. Foss, owner of a major local shoe factory, and is also notable for its well-preserved Colonial Revival styling.  It was listed on the National Register of Historic Places in 1976.

Description
The Foss House is a three-story wood-frame house with a stuccoed exterior, quoined corners,  and a red ceramic tile hip roof.  The main facade, facing south, is a symmetrical three bays, with a central entry flanked by rounded bays that are two stories in height.  The entry is sheltered by a portico topped by a segmented-arch pediment and supported by paired Corinthian columns.  The doorway is flanked by sidelight windows and topped by a triangular pediment The cornices of the portico, doorway pediment, and roof are all modillioned, as are the roof lines of the hip-roof dormers piercing the roof.  A sunporch extends along the eastern facade, and a flat-roofed porch on the west side is connected to a porte-cochere.  A period garage stands on the northwest corner of the property; it features styling similar to that found on the main house.

The house was designed by Gibbs & Pulsifer, an architectural firm based in Lewiston, and built for Horace G. Foss.  Foss was the owner the Dingley-Foss Company, a manufacturer of footwear employing 500-600 workers.

See also
National Register of Historic Places listings in Androscoggin County, Maine

References

Houses on the National Register of Historic Places in Maine
Houses in Auburn, Maine
Houses completed in 1914
National Register of Historic Places in Androscoggin County, Maine
Individually listed contributing properties to historic districts on the National Register in Maine